The Count of Luxemburg is a 1957 West German musical comedy film directed by Werner Jacobs and starring Gerhard Riedmann, Renate Holm and Gunther Philipp. It is based on the 1909 operetta The Count of Luxemburg by Franz Lehár.

It was made at the Spandau Studios in Berlin and on location in Croatia. The film's sets were designed by the art directors Emil Hasler and Paul Markwitz. It was shot using Eastmancolor.

Cast

References

External links

1957 musical comedy films
German musical comedy films
West German films
Films directed by Werner Jacobs
Operetta films
Films based on operettas
Films set in the 1900s
Films set in Paris
German historical comedy films
1950s historical comedy films
Constantin Film films
1950s historical musical films
German historical musical films
Films shot at Spandau Studios
1950s German films
1950s German-language films